The Buri were a Germanic tribe mentioned in the Germania of Tacitus, where they initially "close the back" of the Marcomanni and Quadi of Bohemia and Moravia. It is said that their speech and customs were like those of the Suebi. Such a statement implies that the Buri had recently come from the direction of the Baltic Sea, as other Germanic settlers in Bohemia and Moravia were newcomers, having driven out the Celtic Boii, or more likely absorbing and incorporating them after defeating them in battle and establishing a new authority. In Tacitus, the Buri are not linked to the Lugii.

Ptolemy, however, mentions the Lougoi Bouroi (transliterated by the scholars into Latin Lugi Buri) dwelling in what is today southern Poland between the Elbe, the modern Sudetes, and the upper Vistula. They are distinct from the Silingi (Vandals), who are on the upper Oder. Tacitus and Ptolemy together imply that the Buri may have entered Moravia from Suebia with the Marcomanni and Quadi and then moved into the upper Vistula region, where they allied themselves with the Lugii there.

The fate of the Buri seems tied to that of the Danubian tribes, as they joined the Marcomanni-inspired invasion of the empire in the 2nd century AD, going against the emperor, Marcus Aurelius (Julius Capitolinus, Life of Marcus Aurelius). The latter became a tougher adversary than the Germans had suspected and so many tribes, including the Buri, made a separate peace. They were well rewarded by the Romans for doing so, but they then had to face the vengeance of their old allies (Cassius Dio, Books 72-73). 

After the death of Marcus, and further Germanic unrest, the Buri petitioned his son, Commodus, for peace. At this point they were destitute, having spent their resources on war. As they now met the empire's qualifications for financial aid; to wit, being destitute and potentially dangerous, they received it. The Marcomanni were enjoined from seeking retaliation. Since they themselves were now destitute and seeking terms, they complied, as far as we know.

The Buri now bow off stage. Very likely, their destiny was like that of the other Germanic peoples along the Danube; that is, they either merged with other tribes in Silesia, or they left their homes to join others in their migrations.

A contingent of the Buri accompanied the Suebi in their invasion of the Iberian Peninsula and established themselves in modern northern Portugal in the 5th century. They settled in the region between the rivers Cávado and Homem, in the area known as Terras de Bouro (Lands of the Buri).

See also
 List of Germanic peoples
 Burs (Dacia)
 Battle of Adamclisi

Notes

Early Germanic peoples
Lugii